Little Kimble railway station is a small, single platform railway station serving the village of Little Kimble in Buckinghamshire, England.

Services

Services mostly operate hourly although there are some two or three hour gaps between services.

History
The Wycombe Railway opened the line from Princes Risborough to Aylesbury on 1 October 1863. The Great Western Railway took over the Wycombe Railway in 1867 and opened Little Kimble station in 1872.

The station was transferred from the Western Region of British Rail to the London Midland Region on 24 March 1974.

In 1998 Little Kimble received the British Royal Train. The G8 Summit was held in Birmingham that year and the wives of the G8 countries' leaders, including Cherie Blair and Hillary Clinton, were taken to Chequers via the Royal Train and Little Kimble, which is the nearest station to Chequers. The train reversed at Princes Risborough and the wives alighted at Little Kimble, whence they were transferred to Chequers via limousine.

Little Kimble is in an area of the country where edible dormice (Glis glis) are common and, in 2010, they made their home in the ticket machine meaning that travellers could not buy their tickets.

References

External links

 Chiltern Railways
Little Kimble at Railway Stations UK
 Little Kimble - Least Used Station in Buckinghamshire 2017 YouTube video by Geoff Marshall about the station.

Former Great Western and Great Central Joint Railway stations
Railway stations in Buckinghamshire
DfT Category F2 stations
Railway stations in Great Britain opened in 1863
Railway stations served by Chiltern Railways